HSwMS Ejdern (B01) was the name of a class of four Swedish sonobuoy boats.

Ships of the Swedish Navy
1991 ships